Brian Massamba (born 17 March 1996), known by his stage name Bramsito, is a French singer, songwriter and producer of R&B music and French urban pop. He is signed to 7 Corp founded by Booba.

Career
Bramsito lived for his first 14 years in La Fontaine, a region in Brétigny-sur-Orge before moving to Pithiviers in Loiret. He learned playing the piano starting age 7, and composing when he was 14. In his adolescence, he formed a band "Les Losa" with his friends LFK and Jason Turfu.

In 2016, at the age of 20, he started putting his materials online and was spotted by singer and rapper Fababy who gave him a contract with the label Podium Entertainment. After a disagreement with Fababy, in September 2017 he established his own record label LosaNalosa Music. Soon after, in March 2018, he was approached by French rapper Booba, and signed with Booba's own new label 7 Corp. In November 2018, he recorded "Sale mood" with Booba reaching number 1 in France. The song was certified platinum.  

On 31 May 2019, Bramsito released his debut studio album studio Prémices_ reaching number 21 in France followed up by a sophomore album Losa collaborating with Niska in the single "Criminel". In 2020, he signed with H24 Music at the same time continuing with 7 Corp label.

Discography

Albums

Singles

As lead artist

Featured in

Other songs

References

1996 births
Living people
French male singers
People from Brétigny-sur-Orge